Dehnow-e Mich (also Romanized as Dehnow-e Mīch; also known as Dehno) is a village in Rud Ab-e Gharbi Rural District, Rud Ab District, Narmashir County, Kerman Province, Iran. At the 2006 census, its population was 61, in 16 families.

References 

Populated places in Narmashir County